The James W. Marshall House, located at 60 Bridge Street in Lambertville, Hunterdon County, New Jersey, United States, was the boyhood home of James W. Marshall.  Marshall's discovery of gold in the American River in California in January 1848 set the stage for the California Gold Rush. It is currently the headquarters of the Lambertville Historical Society.

History
In 1816, Philip Marshall (James's father) moved his family from Hopewell, New Jersey to nearby Lambertville.  He purchased 44 perches (approximately five acres) of land from Joseph Lambert for $300 and built a Federal-style brick home. The Marshall family resided in the house until 1834, when Philip died and his wife could no longer afford to live in it.

In 1882, the property was sold to nearby St. John's Roman Catholic Church for use as a convent for the Sisters of Mercy. The Sisters lived in the house and taught in a school that had been built as an addition. In 1964, the congregation of St. John's decided to build a new convent and school, and plans were made to demolish the house.

In an effort to save the house, Lambertville resident Alice Narducci reached an agreement with St. John's to deed the building to the New Jersey Department of Conservation and Economic Development. The state, in turn, leased the property to the Lambertville Historical Society. The kitchen and schoolhouse addition were removed, and a major restoration followed.  The entire back wall of the house was rebuilt using material that matched the original as closely as possible. A similar restoration occurred within the house's interior. The house is decorated in the same time period as when the Marshalls resided in it.

The Marshall House was added to the New Jersey Register of Historic Places on September 11, 1970, and to the National Register of Historic Places on December 18, 1970. It now serves as the headquarters for the Lambertville Historical Society, and is open to the public as an historic house museum.

References

External links
Official site of the James W. Marshall House

Federal architecture in New Jersey
Houses on the National Register of Historic Places in New Jersey
Houses in Hunterdon County, New Jersey
Houses completed in 1816
Historic house museums in New Jersey
Lambertville, New Jersey
Museums in Hunterdon County, New Jersey
National Register of Historic Places in Hunterdon County, New Jersey
1816 establishments in New Jersey
New Jersey Register of Historic Places